Nassaria intacta is a species of sea snail, a marine gastropod mollusk in the family Nassariidae, the true whelks.

Description
The length of the shell attains 21 mm.

Nassaria intacta is a benthic scavenger.

Distribution
This marine species occurs off Tanimbar Island, Indonesia.

References

 Fraussen K. 2006. Deep water Nassaria (Gastropoda: Buccinidae) from Banda and Arafura Seas. Novapex 7(2-3): 31-46

Nassariidae
Gastropods described in 2006